The 2012–13 Delaware Fightin' Blue Hens women's basketball team represented the University of Delaware during the 2012–13 NCAA Division I women's basketball season. The Fightin' Blue Hens, led by seventeenth year head coach Tina Martin, played their home games at the Bob Carpenter Center and were members of the Colonial Athletic Association. They finished the season 32–4, 18-0 CAA play to finish in first place for the second consecutive season. They won the 2013 CAA Women's Basketball Tournament for the second year in a row, defeating Drexel once again in the finals. A #6 seed in the Bridgeport region of the NCAA Division I women's basketball tournament, the Blue Hens defeated West Virginia and North Carolina at home to advance to their first ever Sweet Sixteen, where they fell to Kentucky.

Roster

Schedule

|-
!colspan=9 style="background:#00539f; color:#FFD200;"| Regular season

|-
!colspan=9 style="background:#00539f; color:#FFD200;"| CAA tournament

|-
!colspan=9 style="background:#00539f; color:#FFD200;"| NCAA tournament

Rankings

Awards and honors

 Elena Delle Donne was selected as the Honda National Women's Basketball Player of the Year and a finalist for the Honda-Broderick Cup as Collegiate Woman Athlete of the Year.
 Elena Delle Donne was a consensus 1st team All-American (AP, WBCA, Wooden, USBWA) and the CoSIDA Academic All-American of the Year.
 Elena Delle Donne received CAA Player of the Year, first team All-CAA selection, and CAA All-Defensive team, while Lauren Carra was selected to the second team All-CAA.

Team players drafted into the WNBA

References

External links

Delaware Fightin' Blue Hens women's basketball seasons
Delaware
Fight
Fight